Kadsura renchangiana is a woody vine endemic to the Chinese provinces of Guangxi and Guizhou. It is similar to K. angustifolia but can be distinguished by its thin, oblong leaf blades with strongly arcuate secondary veins.

References

renchangiana
Endemic flora of China
Plants described in 1983